Timothy Bolton Omwenga is a Kenyan International defender currently in the ranks of Tanzanian Premier League side Kagera Sugar F.C.

Club career
The left back turned out for Nzoia Sugar F.C. in the second tier National Super League in 2016 before moving to F.C. Kariobangi Sharks in 2017 in their debut Kenyan Premier League season. 

After two seasons, he moved to KCB and spent another two seasons before crossing over to Tanzanian Premier League side Biashara United. 

He then returned to Kenya to join Nairobi City Stars halfway through the 
2020-21 season before making a trip back to Tanzania to join his current station Kagera Sugar F.C.
 for 2021/22 season.

International
Botlon has been capped five times for the Kenya national football team between 2017 and 2018. His first game was in Apr 2018 against Malawi
 at the Kenyatta Stadium in Machakos. 

In 2018 he featured in four games with Kenya's Olympics squad, the Kenya U23In 2021 he was recalled back to the Kenya national football team for 2022 FIFA World Cup qualification (CAF)

References

External links
 
 Bolton Omwenga at GAS

1996 births
Living people
Kenyan footballers
Nairobi City Stars players
Kenyan Premier League players
Association football defenders
Kenya international footballers